TigerSharks is an American animated children's television series developed by Rankin/Bass and distributed by Lorimar-Telepictures in 1987.  The series involved a team of heroes that could transform into amalgams of human and marine animals and resembled the series ThunderCats and SilverHawks, also developed by Rankin/Bass.

The series lasted one season with 26 episodes and was part of the show The Comic Strip, which consisted of four animated shorts: TigerSharks, Street Frogs, The Mini-Monsters, and Karate Kat.

The animation was provided by Japanese studio Pacific Animation Corporation. Warner Bros. Animation currently owns the series, as they own the 1974–89 Rankin/Bass library, which was incorporated into the merger of Lorimar-Telepictures and Warner Bros. However, no DVD or streaming release of the series has been available worldwide as of today.

Production and development
Rankin/Bass followed up their successful ThunderCats and SilverHawks series with this series about a team of powered up man/marine form hybrids called the "TigerSharks". This third series also featured many of the same voice actors who had worked on ThunderCats and SilverHawks including Larry Kenney, Peter Newman, Earl Hammond, Doug Preis and Bob McFadden.

Story
The members of the TigerShark team were humans who had to use a device called the Fish Tank in order to transform between human and  powered-up marine forms. The TigerSharks' base was a spaceship that could also function underwater. The ship was called the SARK and contained the Fish Tank, along with other research facilities.

The action took place on the fictional world of Water-O (pronounced Wah-tare-oh), which was almost completely covered by water. The planet was inhabited by a race of fish-men called the Waterians. The TigerSharks arrived there on a research mission and ended up serving as the protectors of the planet against the evil T-Ray, who had arrived there beforehand.

Characters

TigerSharks
Protectors of Water-O, the team members are:

 Mako (voiced by Peter Newman) - A gifted scuba diver, he is considered the field leader of the TigerSharks. Mako is not only a good mediator, but also an excellent fighter. He transforms into a human/mako shark hybrid, which grants him incredible speed underwater. Mako also uses his forearm fins and head fin to slice through metal.
 Walro (voiced by Earl Hammond) - The scientific and mechanical genius who created the Fish Tank. He acts as the advisor of the team and is very respected by his comrades. Walro turns into a human/walrus hybrid.  He wields a cane that has a wide variety of weapons.
 Rodolfo "Dolph" (voiced by Larry Kenney) - Second-in-command and also an experienced scuba diver. Dolph has a knack for jokes and fooling around, but he knows when to joke and when to work. Dolph turns into a human/dolphin hybrid, which makes him very maneuverable underwater and can shoot a strong jet of water from his blowhole. However it also makes him the only Tigershark unable to breathe underwater in his aquatic form.  He speaks with an Irish accent.
 Octavia (voiced by Camille Bonora) - Captain of the SARK, communications technician and main strategist. Octavia turns into a human/octopus hybrid (with tentacles instead of hair).
 Lorca - the team's mechanic and often helps Walro to repair or build new machines. He's also the team's strongest member. Lorca turns into a human/orca hybrid.  He speaks with an Australian accent.
 Bronc - A teenager who, along with his sister Angel, works as an assistant aboard the SARK. Bronc is very adventurous, and sometimes reckless. He turns into a human/seahorse hybrid; hence his name, which is derived from "Bronco".
 Angel - Another teenage member of the SARK's crew. She's more serious and responsible than her brother. She turns into a human/angelfish hybrid, hence her name.
 Gupp - the TigerSharks' pet Cocker Spaniel. While his name might imply that he turns into a guppy, his features, including flipper-shaped legs and pin teeth, more closely resemble a seal or sea lion.

Villains
The show featured two major antagonists, both with teams of followers. Both are in alliance to conquer Water-O and destroy the TigerSharks, but plan to betray each other once these goals are met.  They are:

 T-Ray - T-Ray is a human/manta ray hybrid-type creature. He and his Mantanas arrived on Water-O because their home planet had dried up. In seeking to conquer Water-O, he freed Captain Bizzarly and his crew from their iced prison on Seaberia. He is bent on conquering the Waterians and destroying the TigerSharks. He and his assistants cannot survive outside the water without using water breathing apparatus.  He wields a whip.
 Mantanas - The fish-like minions of T-Ray
 Wall-Eye (voiced by Peter Newman) A human/frog hybrid who is T-Ray's aide-de-camp.  He can hypnotize people by spinning his eyes.
 Shad - A bad-tempered human/grouper hybrid.  He wears a belt that can shoot electrical blasts.
 Dredge - A fish-like mutant who carries a purple pet eel on his back.
 Carper and Weakfish - Two merman with frog-like faces. Identical twin brothers who (as befitting their names) whine and complain about everything. Carper has green skin; Weakfish has purple.
 Captain Bizzarly - A pirate with aquaphobia who controlled all crime-related activities on the vast oceans of Water-O until the Waterians froze him and his crew in ice many years ago. T-Ray freed Bizzarly and his crew expecting them to join forces. However, Bizzarly promptly betrayed T-Ray. Bizzarly now constantly tries to get rid of the TigerSharks and regain control of the oceans of Water-O.
 Dragonstein - Captain Bizzarly's pet sea dragon.  He can fly, breathe fire and maneuver underwater.
 Long John Silverfish - A humanoid whose mouth suggests a rat.  He wields an electrified whip.
 Spike Marlin - Bizzarly's first mate, a wrinkly-faced human wielding a customized polearm.
 Soulmate - The only female member of Captain Bizzarly's crew. Her attire suggests a samurai.  She wields a sword, among other weapons.
 Lump - A slimy, shapeshifting blob-like creature.
 Grunt - An overweight humanoid who grunts like an ape.  He's the muscle of Bizzarly's crew.

Episode list
1. Voyage to Water-O
2. SARK to the Rescue
3. Save the SARK
4. The Deep Fryer
5. Bowfin
6. Pappagallo's Present
7. The Lighthouse
8. Go with the Flow
9. Termagant
10. The Terror of Dragonstein
11. The Search for Redfin
12. The Kraken
13. Stowaway
14. Iced
15. The Volcano
16. A Question of Age
17. Eye of the Storm
18. Departure
19. Murky Waters
20. Spellbinder
21. The Waterscope
22. The Point of No Return
23. The Scavenger Hunt
24. Paradise Island
25. The Treasure Map
26. Redfin Returns

In other media
The TigerSharks made a cameo in an episode of the 2011 ThunderCats remake called "Legacy." They are among the animals that were forced to work under Mumm-Ra.

References

External links
 

1987 American television series debuts
1987 American television series endings
1980s American animated television series
First-run syndicated television programs in the United States
Television series by Lorimar Television
Television series by Warner Bros. Television Studios
Television series about shapeshifting
English-language television shows
Television series about pirates
Rankin/Bass Productions television series
American children's animated action television series
American children's animated adventure television series
American children's animated fantasy television series
Nautical television series
Warner Bros. Television Studios franchises